Thomas Edward Bodett (born February 23, 1955) is an American author, voice actor, and radio personality, primarily as a host, correspondent and panelist for a number of shows that air on National Public Radio (NPR).  Since 1986, he has been the spokesman for the motel chain Motel 6, ending commercials with the phrase, "I'm Tom Bodett for Motel 6, and we'll leave the light on for you."

Personal background 
Thomas Edward Bodett was born on February 23, 1955, in Champaign, Illinois, and raised in Sturgis, Michigan. , he resided in Dummerston, Vermont, where he is a member of the town's board of selectmen.

Career

Spokesperson

Motel 6
In 1986, Bodett was building houses in Homer, Alaska, and contributing to NPR's All Things Considered. A creative director at the Richards Group ad agency heard him on NPR and hired him to record a commercial for Motel 6. Bodett ad-libbed the famous line "We'll leave the light on for you" and has been the chain's spokesperson ever since. The director David Fowler hired him because Bodett "sound[ed] like the kind of person who stays there." Fowler said he thought, "Gosh, if I only had an account for a national budget motel brand with a sense of humor and humility, I could make a heck of an advertising campaign with this guy."

In 2005, Motel 6 began using Bodett for their wake-up calls. The chain hoped to bring a more personal touch to people's day by using their spokesperson's voice. Bodett was also featured on the first Motel 6 podcast, released for the holidays.

In November 2015, a new marketing campaign featuring Bodett's voice premiered, highlighted by TV and radio commercials touting the investment in and renovation of Motel 6 properties nationwide.

Jamesway
From 1993 to 1994, Bodett was also the spokesperson for Jamesway department stores in Delaware, New Jersey, New York, and Pennsylvania, and recorded radio commercials for it. A discount chain, Jamesway filed Chapter 7 bankruptcy in the fall of 1995 and closed at the end of the year.

Media appearances

Radio
As a broadcaster, Bodett hosted two radio programs: The End of the Road (1988–1990) and Bodett & Company (1993).

In 1999, Bodett started The Loose Leaf Book Company, a radio program that centered on author and book interviews, discussions, and dramatizations.

, he is a contributor to The Bob Edwards Show on XMPR and a member of the stable of panelists on Wait Wait... Don't Tell Me!, a National Public Radio news quiz show.

In 2015, he was interviewed as a guest on Episode 301 of Public Radio International's Live Wire Radio.

Television
Bodett hosted the public television program Travels on America's Historic Trails (1997). He also appeared on the Animaniacs cartoon series, doing the voice-over for "Mime Time" and the "Good Idea/Bad Idea" segments featuring Mr. Skullhead, had a brief cameo in Pinky and the Brain, and narrated the direct-to-video Animaniacs movie Wakko's Wish (1999).

Webzine
Bodett was a regular columnist for the webzine Mr. Showbiz.

Podcasts
Bodett's name was used humorously for various non-playable characters in the Dungeons and Dragons podcast series The Adventure Zone, though these were voiced by dungeon master Griffin McElroy, not Bodett himself. In the graphic novel under the same name, an uncanny likeness of Bodett can be seen interacting with the series' main characters.

Writing 
In 1999, Bodett published his first children's book, Williwaw!

Published works 
 As Far As You Can Go Without a Passport (1986), 
 Small Comforts (1987), 
 The End of the Road (1989), 
 The Big Garage on Clear Shot (1990), 
 The Free Fall of Webster Cummings (1996), 
 America's Historic Trails (1997), 
 Williwaw! (2000), 
 Norman Tuttle on the Last Frontier (2004), 
 "Alaska A to Z: The Most Comprehensive Book of Facts and Figures Ever Compiled About Alaska" (1993), 
 "The Free Fall of Webster Cummings: Volume One of "Tom Bodett's American Odyssey"  (1960)
 "America's Historic Trails: With Tom Bodett" (1997), 
 "Growing Up, Growing Old & Going Fishing at the End of the Road" 
 "Those Grand Occasions at the end of the Road"
 "As Far as You Can Go Without a Passport:  Views from the End of the Road" (1985)
 "First Words"
 "Old Fools & Young Hearts"
 "No Place Like Home"

 "(The) Last Decent Parking Place in North America",  
Audio Cassette - 1991 by Random House Audio
"The Free Fall of Webster Cummings: Volume One of "Tom Bodett's American Odyssey" (1960) Audio Cassette
 "The Great Divide, Volume Two (Tom Bodett's American Odyssey)" (1995),  Audio Cassette
 "Peach Picking Time, Volume Three (Tom Bodett's American Odyssey)" (1995),  Audio Cassette
 "No Place Like Home, Volume Four (Tom Bodett's American Odyssey)" (1996),  Audio Cassette
 "Ed's Fruits and Vegetables, Volume 5 (Tom Bodett's American Odyssey)" (1996),  Audio Cassette
Song, Tom Bodett by Mark David Manders
 "Better Part of the Road"(1992),  Audio Cassette

References

External links
 
 

American children's writers
American humorists
American radio personalities
American male voice actors
Audiobook narrators
Writers from Michigan
Writers from Vermont
Writers from Alaska
Writers from Washington (state)
Writers from Illinois
People from Sturgis, Michigan
People from Homer, Alaska
People from Champaign, Illinois
People from Dummerston, Vermont
1955 births
Living people